Benjamin Bull (January 1, 1798 – January 23, 1879) was an American lawyer and politician.

Born in Harper's Ferry, Virginia (now West Virginia), Bull moved with his parents to Xenia, Ohio. He went to school there, studied law and was admitted to the Ohio bar. He then moved to Martinsville, Indiana, in 1824, practiced law, and was a probate judge. In 1848 he moved to Mineral Point, Wisconsin and then to Grant County, Wisconsin where he practiced law. He then moved to Prairie du Chien, Wisconsin and practiced law. He served in the Wisconsin State Senate in 1865–1866 as a member of the National Union Party.

Notes

1798 births
1879 deaths
People from Harpers Ferry, West Virginia
People from Prairie du Chien, Wisconsin
Politicians from Xenia, Ohio
People from Martinsville, Indiana
Ohio lawyers
Indiana state court judges
Indiana lawyers
Wisconsin lawyers
Wisconsin state senators
People from Mineral Point, Wisconsin
People from Grant County, Wisconsin
19th-century American politicians
19th-century American judges
19th-century American lawyers